The SS Flynderborg was a Danish steam merchant ship.  She was taken over after the fall of Denmark during the Second World War, and sailed under the British flag.  She sailed in a number of convoys before being sunk whilst carrying supplies to the UK in 1941.

Early career
Flynderborg was built by W. Gray & Co Ltd, of West Hartlepool in 1930 for the Danish firm C.K. Hansen, of Copenhagen.  After the German invasion of Denmark in 1940 she was seized by the British on 22 August and transferred to the Ministry of War Transport.  She retained her original name but was operated for the Ministry by Hall Brothers, of Newcastle upon Tyne.  She served in a number of convoys, initially between UK ports, but then moved to transatlantic crossings.  She was part of the ill-fated convoy SC 7, but was one of the few merchants to safely reach port in the UK.

Sinking
She continued to take part in the convoys. Her last one was with convoy SC 52 under the command of her master P. Petersen. She arrived at the assembly point at Sydney, Nova Scotia from Parrsboro, Nova Scotia, sailing from Sydney on 29 October 1941 bound for London with a cargo of 2,125 tons of lumber. She launched a number of torpedoes at 04.54, 04.58 and 05:05 hours, and observed hits on two ships and heard a third strike a target. Flynderborg and  had been hit and sunk. U-202 went on to sink a capsized wreck with a coup de grâce at 08:44 hours, which may have been either Flynderborg or Gretavale.

References
SS Flynderborg at Uboat.net
Flynderborg at convoy web

Merchant ships of Denmark
Ships sunk by German submarines in World War II
Steamships
Ships built on the River Tees
World War II merchant ships of the United Kingdom
World War II shipwrecks in the Atlantic Ocean
1930 ships
Maritime incidents in November 1941